Sonya Renee Taylor is a New York Times best-selling author, activist, thought leader, spoken word artist, and founder of The Body is Not An Apology global movement. Taylor's work focuses on body liberation, racial justice, and transformational change using her framework of radical self-love. Her website describes her as "one of many midwives for the new world." The author of seven books, Taylor's other projects include the popular "What's Up, Y'all?" video series and the reparations-inspired Buy Back Black Debt initiative, which in October 2020 cleared over half a million dollars in Black-held debt. She is a Black queer woman who also holds the identities fat, cisgender, and neurodivergent. Her pronouns are she/her.

The Body Is Not An Apology 
This movement is about fostering "global, radical, unapologetic self love which translates to radical human love and action in service toward a more just, equitable and compassionate world". It strives to reduce violence against people who have been marginalized and had violence perpetuated against them, including "...racist violence including lynching, slavery, holocausts, and internment camps...LGBTQIA people being assaulted, murdered and driven to suicide regularly...rape and sexual assault...the bombing of abortion clinics and the murder of physicians supporting women's rights to autonomy over their own bodies...involuntary sterilization of people with disabilities...debilitating shame that people around the world live with as a result of the psychological attacks our social and media machines wage against us, ending in bulimia and anorexia, addiction, stigma, racism, homophobia, ableism, sizeism, ageism, transphobia, mass self-hatred, and senseless violence as a result of body hatred." The movement has also come out with the RUHCUS Project (Radically Unapologetic Healing Challenge 4 Us), an exercise that takes place over 30 days aimed at helping people in their goal of body empowerment. The medium that their movement uses to get their message out is Facebook, Tumblr, and their website. These sites are all very accessible to a wide audience, including those with vision impairments. All of their posts include captions describing the picture so someone using narration technology would still be able to get a similar experience to other people using the sites. Their posts are also about a large variety of subjects, with topics like weight/size, disability, sexuality, gender, mental health, race, aging, rad parents, men, global, intersections, and "H", a section that stands for "handle that", a more radically inclusive version of the phrase "man up."

Slam poetry career 
In her career as a spoken word artist, Taylor won multiple National and International poetry slams, including the 2004 U.S. National Individual Poetry Slam competition, the 2005 DC/Baltimore Grand Slam competition, the 2007 Ill List III Slam competition, and the 2006 Four Continents International Slam competition. Her global reach has included performances for audiences across the US, New Zealand, Australia, England, Scotland, Sweden, Canada, and the Netherlands. Taylor’s venues for poetry performance have included prisons, mental health treatment facilities, homeless shelters, universities, festivals, and public schools across the globe.

Spoken word as hip hop 
While hip hop is traditionally thought of in terms of music, graffiti, break dancing, and deejaying it also includes other creative forms like film, spoken word, autobiographies, literature and journalism. Hip hop began as a creative way to express complicated emotions surrounding the experience of being marginalized and oppressed, and as a source of activism. The notions of claiming space for the self and one's community and expressing your agency through having a voice and opinions are central themes in the creation of hip hop. Hip hop has roots in African traditions and art, incorporating rhythms and storytelling, using a combination of the human voice and instruments. Spoken word specifically is a "deeply rooted tradition that has manifested itself in a stream of poets that have served as clarifiers of the 'ultimate realities' that Black people face." 
In her work, Taylor sets out telling a story that makes the reader or listener wonder and question about the meaning of the work, challenging their understanding of the themes or topics they just took in. She has written articles about the intersections of race and gender on the topic of body positivity, critiquing the current ideas society has around the movement, making it more inclusive and claiming space for those who have been noticeably left out of the conversation. "Our society tells us fatness is not beautiful.  Blackness is not beautiful.  So even while reclaiming size diversity as beautiful, the presence of Blackness complicates the narrative...It is this unwillingness to wade through the murky waters of race that make Black and Brown women invisible even in the places where we say we are trying to make people seen."

Works 
In 2010 Taylor released her first book, A Little Truth on Your Shirt, a collection of her poetry that has been described as challenging, asking the reader hard questions. She was included in several different anthologies, including Elephant Engine High Dive Revival, Junkyard Ghost Revival Anthology, Just Like a Girl: A Manifesta, Spoken Word Revolution Redux, and Growing Up Girl: An Anthology of Voices from Marginalized Spaces. She was also featured in various journals and magazines including Domain Magazine, Reality Magazine, Off Our Backs, The City Morgue, and X Magazine. She's made appearances on networks like CBS News, MTV, BET, TVOne, Oxygen Network, CNN, PBS, and NPR as well as on HBO's Def Poetry Jam.

In 2018, Taylor published The Body is Not an Apology: The Power of Radical Self-Love. In February 2021, the second edition of the book became a New York Times best-seller, placing at #6 in the Advice, How-To & Miscellaneous category.

In 2021, Taylor edited The Routledge International Handbook of Fat Studies, alongside Cat Pausé.

In 2022, as part of the launch for their 12-week global Institute for Radical Permission, Taylor authored The Journal of Radical Permission with fellow author and poet adrienne maree brown.

References

LGBT African Americans
Queer writers
21st-century African-American writers
21st-century American women writers
21st-century African-American women writers
21st-century American poets
African-American poets
American women poets
Hampton University alumni
Place of birth missing (living people)
Year of birth missing (living people)
Slam poets
Living people